The Alice Henderson Strong House is a house located in southwest Portland, Oregon listed on the National Register of Historic Places.

See also
 National Register of Historic Places listings in Southwest Portland, Oregon

References

Houses on the National Register of Historic Places in Portland, Oregon
Houses completed in 1912
Arts and Crafts architecture in Oregon
1912 establishments in Oregon
Southwest Hills, Portland, Oregon
Portland Historic Landmarks